Lee Jay Thompson (born 5 October 1957), nicknamed Kix or El Thommo, is an English multi-instrumentalist, singer, songwriter, and composer. In a career spanning more than 40 years, Thompson came to prominence in the late 1970s as a founder and saxophonist for the English ska band Madness.

Early years
Prior to forming Madness, Thompson and future Madness keyboardist Mike Barson gained some notoriety as graffiti artists in the mid-1970s. After reading about the emerging New York graffiti scene, they spray-painted their nicknames ("Kix" and "Mr B") along with two friends' names "Cat" and "Columbo" around North London. They managed to spray their nicknames on George Melly's garage door, prompting Melly to write a newspaper article declaring: "If I ever catch that Mr B, Kix and Columbo, I'm going to kick their arses".

Music career

Thompson founded Madness with Mike Barson and Chris Foreman in 1976, and wrote the group's debut single, "The Prince". Among the other songs, he wrote or co-wrote the singles "Embarrassment", "House of Fun", and "Uncle Sam". His experiences of being a petty criminal and serving time in borstal in his youth inspired his lyrics for "Land of Hope and Glory" and "One's Second Thoughtlessness", the latter an unusual diversion into synthpop for the group. Thompson performed lead vocals for both tracks. He also sang the vocals on his own composition, "Razor Blade Alley", which was a regular inclusion in early Madness shows. Thompson reunited with all seven original Madness members in 1992.

After Madness disbanded in 1986, Thompson formed a new band The Madness with Foreman, Suggs and Chas Smash, but they broke up after releasing one album in 1988. Thompson then joined forces with Foreman, and the pair began to write songs. They soon recorded an album at Liquidator Studios with Thompson on vocals and saxophone and Foreman playing the other instruments. This album included the song "Magic Carpet", which was co-written with Suggs and originally intended to be included on a Madness album. When it came to promoting their debut album, they found they needed to form a group and also decide on a name. Due to an error at the printers, the band name and album title were accidentally switched, and they started off as The Nutty Boys. The album was re-released in 2002, and the mistake was rectified, with the group now known as Crunch! During this time Lee was often found in the early hours flyposting with part time keyboard player of Crunch Mark Sexbery in the East End.

Thompson founded The Dance Brigade with Keith Finch in 2007, and they were joined by Jennie Matthias of The Belle Stars. The other musicians came from projects that they had all been involved in. He also fronted and played saxophone with a covers band called The Camden Cowboys.

Thompson was featured floating while playing a red, white, and blue-colored saxophone in the closing ceremonies of the 2012 Summer Olympics.

In 2011, Thompson began performing with The Lee Thompson Ska Orchestra who released the album The Benevolence of Sister Mary Ignatius in 2013. They released the single "Fu Man Chu" featuring Bitty McLean from this album and, in February 2014, released the follow up single "Bangarang" featuring Dawn Penn and Sharon Shannon.

In 2021 Thompson's autobiography, Growing Out Of It:  Machinations Before Madness was released.

Personal life
In 1984, Thompson married Debbie (née Fordham). They have three children named Tuesday, Daley and Kye.

References

External links

1957 births
Living people
Musicians from London
Ska saxophonists
English saxophonists
British male saxophonists
English songwriters
Madness (band) members
People from St Pancras, London
People from Finchley
21st-century saxophonists
English memoirists
British ska musicians